Hyde Park is a municipal park in St. Louis.

Geography
The Hyde Park grounds are centered in the St. Louis neighborhood of Hyde Park.

Surrounding area
The park is bordered by Blair Ave. on the east, Salisbury Street on the south, 20th Street on the west, and Bremen Ave. on the North.

See also
People and culture of St. Louis, Missouri
Neighborhoods of St. Louis
Parks in St. Louis, Missouri

External links
Hyde Park Description

Parks in St. Louis
Culture of St. Louis
Tourist attractions in St. Louis
1854 establishments in Missouri